Timo Legout (born 13 March 2002) is a French tennis player.

Legout has a career high ATP singles ranking of 716 achieved on 15 November 2021. He also has a career high ATP doubles ranking of 2078 achieved on 1 November 2021.

Legout made his ATP main draw debut at the 2022 Open 13 after receiving a wildcard into the doubles main draw with Ugo Blanchet.

ATP Challenger and ITF World Tennis Tour finals

Singles: 5 (2-3)

Doubles: 1 (0–1)

References

External links

2002 births
Living people
French male tennis players
Sportspeople from Nogent-sur-Marne